Luca Checchin (born 3 May 1997) is a former Italian footballer who plays as a midfielder. He is not anymore under contract with Hellas Verona. He left football after many injuries on his right foot, despite his young age.

Club career
Checchin is a youth exponent from Hellas Verona. He made his debut on 28 October 2015 against Fiorentina in a Serie A game replacing Matuzalém after 83 minutes.

References

External links

1997 births
People from Voghera
Footballers from Lombardy
Living people
Italian footballers
Italy youth international footballers
Association football midfielders
Hellas Verona F.C. players
A.C. Prato players
Brescia Calcio players
U.S. Viterbese 1908 players
U.S. Alessandria Calcio 1912 players
Serie A players
Serie C players
Sportspeople from the Province of Pavia